Joonas Kemppainen (born 7 April 1988) is a Finnish professional ice hockey forward who currently plays for Oulun Kärpät of the Liiga.

Playing career
Undrafted, Kemppainen played nine seasons in the Finnish Liiga with Ässät, HPK and Oulun Kärpät. After his second consecutive season of 30 plus points with Kärpät in the 2014–15 season, on 21 May 2015, Boston Bruins general manager Don Sweeney announced that the club had signed Kemppainen to a one-year, two-way NHL contract for the 2015–16 season.

He picked up his first NHL assist and scored his first NHL goal on 23 October 2015, against Jaroslav Halák of the New York Islanders in a 5-3 Bruins victory.

Less than a year after coming to the United States, Kemppainen signed a deal with KHL hockey club Sibir Novosibirsk on 14 May 2016.

Following two productive seasons with Salavat Yulaev Ufa, including reaching the Eastern Conference Finals in the 2018–19 season, posting 14 points in 17 games, Kemppaninen secured a lucrative one-year contract with SKA Saint Petersburg on 1 May 2019.

Kemppaninen played three seasons with SKA Saint Petersburg before leaving following the 2021–22 campaign to return to his native Finland on a one-year contract with former club, Kärpät of the Liiga, on 27 April 2022.

International play
Kemppainen competed in the 2015 IIHF World Championships, finishing third on Team Finland in scoring in his debut senior tournament.

Career statistics

Regular season and playoffs

International

References

External links

1988 births
Living people
Ässät players
Boston Bruins players
Finnish expatriate ice hockey players in Russia
Finnish expatriate ice hockey players in the United States
Finnish ice hockey forwards
HPK players
Mikkelin Jukurit players
Oulun Kärpät players
Ice hockey players at the 2018 Winter Olympics
Olympic ice hockey players of Finland
People from Kajaani
Providence Bruins players
Salavat Yulaev Ufa players
HC Sibir Novosibirsk players
SKA Saint Petersburg players
Undrafted National Hockey League players
Sportspeople from Kainuu